Pablo Sánchez Pájaro (born March 28, 1990 in San Luis Potosí City, San Luis Potosí) is a Mexican professional association football (soccer) player who plays as a defensive midfielder for C.D. Tepatitlán de Morelos.

Career
Sánchez started out his career in the youth team of his local club, San Luis F.C., later transferring to the youth team of Monarcas Morelia for two years before returning to his hometown club. While being captain of the U-20s and participating intermittently with the senior team he suffered a shoulder luxation which eventually required surgery and a recovery time of 3 months. After his recovery he went on to play for Club Nacional in Paraguay, where he participated with the reserve team. Afterwards he returned to play for the newly formed Atlético San Luis, where he would mark his debut in the Copa MX against Puebla F.C., as well as in Ascenso MX against Correcaminos UAT. After 3 tournaments under 3 different coaches the team was eventually dissolved. Sanchez remained playing in the club's brother team Club Deportivo Tepatitlán de Morelos, on Mexico's second division.

External links
 

Liga MX players
Living people
Mexican footballers
1990 births
People from San Luis Potosí City
Association football midfielders
Atlético San Luis footballers